The Stadin Derby, or The Helsinki Derby, is the name for a Helsinki association football fixture played between HIFK Fotboll and HJK Helsinki. The name of the derby derives from the common slang word nickname for Helsinki (Stadi), widely used by the locals. Both the teams play at the highest level of football in Finland, in Veikkausliiga. Before 2015, the clubs had not faced each other at the highest level since 1972 when HIFK got relegated from the top league, which was then known as Mestaruussarja.

The rivalry extends from 1909 when the two teams faced each other for the first time. HJK used to be associated with the Finnish speaking middle-class population at the time, whereas HIFK was known for being a club of the Swedish speaking middle-class population. The language has been the main reason for the rivalry but to date the importance of it has diminished significantly. Before HIFK got relegated from the top league the fixtures had been played at the Helsinki Olympic Stadium, but are nowadays played at the Sonera Stadium. Both clubs play their home fixtures at this particular venue.

The two teams clashed for the first time at the top level since 1972 on 23 April 2015. The match was played at a sold out Sonera Stadium and ended in a 1-1 draw.

Supporters
The supporters of both of the teams are known for the rivalry against each other and winning the derby fixtures decides "Stadin herruus" (in English: the mastership of Helsinki) between the clubs. The team which manages to earn more points from Stadin derby fixtures within a single season, are awarded the Stadin herruus-trophy, which was first awarded in the late 1920s. If the points are even, goal difference decides the winner of the trophy. In case the goal differences are same, the winner will be undecided for the season. 

The most renowned supporter group of HIFK is known as Stadin kingit (in English: the kings of Helsinki). The supporters of HJK on the other hand are divided into two separate groups: Forza HJK and Sakilaiset. Stadin kingit and Sakilaiset have caused some controversy due to fights and minor football hooliganism between some members of the two groups. For example, prior to a Europa League fixture on 27 November 2014, some supporters of HJK and FC Copenhagen had a fight with each other. Copenhagen supporters were allegedly accompanied by Stadin kingit, as Stadin kingit share a friendship between Copenhagen supporters. Hooliganism is a relatively small issue in Finland and attending football matches in Finland is safe.

According to a 2012 survey, HJK was supported by 25% of all Finnish football supporters and 59% of those living in the Uusimaa region. The HIFK football branch was supported by 7% of all supporters and 12% of those living in Uusimaa. Ultimately both clubs are well supported all over the country as 30% of HJK supporters and 49% of HIFK supporters came outside of the Uusimaa region. However, HIFK's most popular sports section is the ice hockey one.

Matches
Updated 1.2.2020

HIFK in the league at home

HJK in the league at home

Cup

Other

Honours

Records

Biggest wins (5+ goals)

Goalscorers

Top 10 scorers (Modern era)

Top scorers (Mestaruussarja)

Players for both clubs

This is a list of players who played at least one competitive first team fixture for both clubs either in finnish championship competition or lower division.

Other:
Tommy Lindholm played for HIFK in 1969 and 1970 seasons and managed HJK in 1996
Hannu Kautiainen played for HJK from 1970 to 1976 and coached HIFK for 10 seasons after his playing career
Gösta Löfgren was founding member of HJK but left the club before the first finnish championship in 1908 and later joined HIFK
Antti Muurinen Head coach for HJK 1997-1999 and 2007-2012 and for HIFK 2016-2017

References

Association football rivalries
1909 establishments in Finland
HIFK Fotboll
Football in Finland